The 2nd Cavalry Brigade was a formation of the Royal Hungarian Army that participated in the Axis invasion of Yugoslavia during World War II.

Organization 
Structure of the brigade:

 Headquarters - under Brigadier General Antal Vattay
 4th Armoured Reconnaissance Battalion
 1st Cavalry Regiment
 2nd Cavalry Regiment
 15th Bicycle Battalion
 16th Bicycle Battalion
 4th Motorized Artillery Battalion
 4th Horse Artillery Battalion
 2nd Cavalry Artillery Battalion
 2nd Cavalry Anti-Aircraft Battery
 2nd Cavalry Engineer Company
 2nd Cavalry Bridging Engineer Company
 2nd Cavalry Signal Company
 2nd Cavalry Traffic Control Signal Company
 2nd Cavalry Brigade Service Regiment

Notes

References
 

Military units and formations of Hungary in World War II